"Got a Love for You" is a song recorded by American vocal trio Jomanda for their debut studio album, Someone to Love Me (1990). It was released as a single in 1991 and hit number one on the US Billboard Dance Club Songs chart for one week. The single also crossed over to the pop charts, becoming their only top 40 hit on the Billboard Hot 100. The single release included remixes from Eric Miller and Steve "Silk" Hurley.

"Got a Love for You" was sampled by South African singer Brenda Fassie on her song "Ngiyakusaba". A cover version was released in the summer of 2017 by Canadian-Armenian producer DerHova featuring vocals by Asmik Shiroyan.

Critical reception
Larry Flick from Billboard wrote, "This delicious jam takes the femme trio back to its deep house roots after a brief flirtation with urban radio. Of the six remixes, be sure to check out Steve "Silk" Hurley's and Eric Miller's versions, both of which emphasize rich harmonizing and spine-stirring percussion." Alan Jones from Music Week constated that produced by Hurley, "the glamorous trio from New Jersey will undoubtedly have a pop smash too with this irrestistible house groove." In 1997, he declared it as "one of the best dance records of the Nineties" and a "all-time anthem".

Impact
"Got a Love for You" was ranked number 78 in Slant Magazines list of the 100 Greatest Dance Songs of All Time in 2020.

Track listing and formats
 US 12-inch vinyl single
Got a Love for You (Hurley's House Mix) – 7:34
Got a Love for You (Hurley's Dub) – 5:22
Got a Love for You (Hurley's Radio) – 5:24
Got a Love for You (Love Mix) – 6:02
Got a Love for You (Smoove Underground Mix) – 5:27
Got a Love for You (Extended Version) – 5:41

 European CD and UK 12-inch vinyl single
Got a Love for You (Edit) – 4:24
Got a Love for You (Hurley's House Mix) – 7:34
Got a Love for You (Smoove Underground Mix) – 5:27

Charts

References

1991 singles
1991 songs
House music songs
Warner Records singles